The Canigó is a mountain located in the Pyrenees of southern France.

Due to its sharp flanks and its dramatic location near the coast, until the 18th century the Canigou was believed to be the highest mountain in the Pyrenees.

Being between south and Northern Catalonia, the mountain has a historical symbolical significance for Catalan people.

Geography 
The Canigó is located in Pyrénées-Orientales, south of Prades and north of Prats-de-Mollo-la-Preste. Its summit lies on the border between two communes: Vernet-les-Bains and Taurinya (although the territories of two other communes - Casteil and Valmanya - approach quite closely to the summit). Its location makes it visible from the plains of Roussillon and from Conflent in France, and as well from Empordà in Spain.

This phenomenon was observed in 1808 by baron Franz Xaver von Zach from the Notre-Dame de la Garde basilica in Marseille. All year long, it can also be seen, with good weather, from Agde, Port-Camargue and the Montagne Noire.

Trekking and sightseeing

Jeep tracks on the north side of the massif lead to the Chalet des Cortalets (at 2150 m) which is a popular outpost with walkers.

There are two ancient monasteries at the foot of the mountain, Martin-du-Canigou and Saint-Michel-de-Cuxa.

Canigó Flame
The mountain has symbolical significance for Catalan people. On its summit stands a cross that is often decorated with the Catalan flag. Every year on 23 June, the night before St. John's day (nit de Sant Joan), there is a ceremony called Flama del Canigó. French Catalans carry a flaming torch from Perpignan to the cross and the Catalonian flag on top of the mountain, and people light bonfires throughout the area.

Literature
The Canigó inspired the epic poem "Canigó" by Catalan poet Jacint Verdaguer i Santaló. 
In these verses Verdaguer compares the snowy mountain to a Magnolia flower (pages 27–28):

While he was staying in Vernet-les-Bains in 1911, Kipling wrote about Canigou. In a letter to the Club Alpin, he praised it as a "magician among mountains".

Kipling also wrote a light-hearted short story entitled Why Snow Falls at Vernet. It makes fun of the English habit of always talking about the weather.

See also
 Prieuré de Serrabone
 St-Martin-du-Canigou monastery
 Vernet-les-Bains

Notes

References
Canigó by Verdaguer; Full text - Wikitext

External links

Canigo.cat All information about the Canigou massif: nature, culture and itineraries (in Catalan)

Mountains of the Pyrenees
Catalan symbols
Mountains of Pyrénées-Orientales